Jordan Thomas Hill (born February 8, 1991) is a former American football defensive tackle. He was drafted by the Seattle Seahawks in the third round of the 2013 NFL Draft. He played college football at Penn State.

Early years
Hill was born in Harrisburg, Pennsylvania.  He attended Steelton Highspire High School in suburban Harrisburg, and played high school football for the Steelton-Highspire Steamrollers.  After a senior season which he earned all-state accolades while helping the Steamrollers win a Class A state championship, Penn State defensive line coach Larry Johnson recruited Hill heavily.  Although he had offers from Pittsburgh, Rutgers, and Temple, Hill quickly committed to Penn State.

Recruiting

College career
Hill enrolled in Pennsylvania State University, where he played for the Penn State Nittany Lions football team from 2009 to 2012.  He played relatively sparingly in his freshman season, but did record 12 tackles in 8 games, and started four games and played in all 11 during his sophomore year.

As a junior in 2011, Hill led the defensive line by recording 59 tackles including 8 for a loss and 3.5 sacks. Perhaps his best game of the year was against Illinois when he recorded 10 tackles including a tackle for a loss.  He earned honorable mention all Big Ten.

In wake of the Penn State child sex abuse scandal, Hill was one of the first Penn State players to come out in support of coach Joe Paterno.  "I'm still a big supporter of coach Paterno and he is one of the reasons that I'm here," he said.  "All you can really say is no man is perfect at all."

After Penn State's first loss to Ohio University in 2012, Hill, acting as a senior leader, came out and said that the team needed to move forward.  Midway through the season, coach Bill O'Brien stumped for Hill and teammates Gerald Hodges and Michael Mauti for several year end awards or for the All-American team.

Professional career

Seattle Seahawks
The Seattle Seahawks chose Hill in the third round, with the 87th overall pick, of the 2013 NFL Draft.  On May 10, 2013, he signed a multi-year rookie contract with Seahawks; financial terms were not disclosed at the time of the announcement. He played in 4 games in the 2013 season, recording 7 tackles and 1.5 sacks, ultimately winning a Super Bowl ring in Super Bowl XLVIII.

In 2014, Hill was a small contributor until Brandon Mebane was placed on injured reserve after a Week 10 game against the New York Giants. Over the final 6 games of the regular season (all wins by the Seahawks, with a total of 39 points allowed), Hill recorded 13 tackles and 5.5 sacks. In a week 15 game against the San Francisco 49ers, he had two sacks of quarterback Colin Kaepernick. In week 17, he had half a sack and his first career interception of quarterback Shaun Hill. In this week 17 game, Hill would get injured and ultimately be placed on injured reserve, ending his season as the playoffs started.

On September 3, 2016, he was placed on injured reserve. He was released on October 16, 2016.

Washington Redskins
On November 8, 2016, Hill was signed by the Washington Redskins. He was waived on November 19, 2016.

Jacksonville Jaguars
Hill was claimed off waivers by the Jaguars on November 21, 2016.

Detroit Lions
On March 20, 2017, Hill signed with the Detroit Lions. He was placed on injured reserve on August 27, 2017, and suffering a biceps injury.

Personal life
Hill is the son of Larry and Sue (Dagenhart) Hill. Hill has said that he draws motivation from his father Larry, who has diabetes and suffered from a mild stroke four years ago.

Trinity High School Football
As of February 2021, Hill is now the head football coach at Trinity High School, located in Shiremanstown, Pennsylvania.

References

External links

Seattle Seahawks bio
Penn State Nittany Lions bio

1991 births
Living people
African-American players of American football
Players of American football from Harrisburg, Pennsylvania
American football defensive tackles
American football defensive ends
Penn State Nittany Lions football players
Seattle Seahawks players
Washington Redskins players
Jacksonville Jaguars players
Detroit Lions players
21st-century African-American sportspeople